Gordon Forbes may refer to:

Gordon Forbes (born 1934), South African tennis player and author
Gordon Forbes (figure skater) (born c. 1959), Canadian figure skater
Gordon Forbes (British Army officer) (1738–1797), British Army general
Gordon Forbes (Minnesota politician) (1920–2003), American lawyer and politician